Otocinclus mimulus is a species of armoured catfish found in small tributaries of the Monday river, itself a tributary of the Paraná river.

Otocinclus  mimulus is a Batesian mimic of Corydoras diphyes. C. diphyes is inedible to many species due to its bony armor and so individual O. mimulus that look more similar to C. diphyes are less likely to be eaten by predators like Crenicichla lepidota. O. mimulus is named for its mimicry of C. diphyes.

References

Hypoptopomatini
Fish of South America
Taxa named by Thomas Erik Axenrot
Taxa named by Sven O. Kullander
Fish described in 2003